Toormang-2 is a union council of Lower Dir District in Khyber Pakhtunkhwa, Pakistan. Lower Dir District has 6 Tehsils and 37 union councils.

See also 
 Toormang-1

 Lower Dir District

References

Lower Dir District
Union Councils of Lower Dir District
Union councils of Khyber Pakhtunkhwa